Jean-Pierre Elkabbach (born 29 September 1937)  is a French journalist.

Biography
Elkabbach was born to an Algerian Jewish family in Oran in 1937, then the prefecture of the département d'Oran in French Algeria.  He began his journalistic career in 1960 as a radio correspondent in Algiers, but having taken part in the strikes of May 1968, he was sidelined and sent to Toulouse.  Elkabbach would later spend time in Bonn, Germany, before venturing into television news in 1970. From 1993 to 1996 he served as president of France 2 and France 3, from 1999 to 2009 he was president of the television station Public Sénat, and he was at the helm of Europe 1 from 2005 to 2008.

Elkabbach presents Bibliothèque Médicis on Public Sénat, during which he interviews an eclectic mix of international literati, political leaders, intellectuals, and historians.

He is the father of successful actress Emmanuelle Bach.

Works

Books
 (with Édouard Balladur)
 (with Nicole Avril)

Television
François Mitterrand: conversations avec un président, documentary filmed between April 1993 and June 1994, broadcast on France 2 in May 2001 in five episodes

References

External links

1937 births
Living people
20th-century French journalists
21st-century French journalists
People from Oran
Commandeurs of the Légion d'honneur
French people of Algerian-Jewish descent
French male non-fiction writers
French television journalists
Sciences Po alumni